Eliza is an unincorporated community and census-designated place in Eliza Township, Mercer County, Illinois, United States. As of the 2020 census it had a population of 25.

History
The Bishop family settled the town around the 1840s. The grandson John Bishop owned almost all of the town, including his own general store. He had been manager of the town band since 1914. The town also had a basketball team. Their church was named the Eliza Episcopal Church. By the late 1920s, the town had  of farmland along with a general store, drugstore, church, theater, dancehall, pool hall, and a barber shop, among houses and a few community buildings. On November 14, 1929, John Bishop auctioned off almost all the town, save for four houses. His reasons were not officially stated, but could have likely been due to the recent start of the Great Depression in late October. News of the auction was featured in newspapers as far away as Ohio, Iowa, and New Jersey.

Geography
It sits on a hilltop that drains east to Irwin Branch, a south-flowing tributary of Eliza Creek, which flows southwest to the Mississippi River at New Boston.

Demographics

References

Census-designated places in Mercer County, Illinois
Census-designated places in Illinois
Unincorporated communities in Mercer County, Illinois
Unincorporated communities in Illinois